Luis Vicente Cabrera Lobato (July 17, 1876 – April 12, 1954) was a Mexican lawyer, politician and writer. His pen name for his political essays was "Lic. Blas Urrea"; the more literary works he wrote as "Lucas Rivera". During the late presidency of Porfirio Díaz, he was a vocal critic of the regime. He became an important civilian intellectual in the Mexican Revolution (1910-1920).

He was a co-founder of the Anti-Re-electionist Party, which backed the candidacy of Francisco I. Madero, and when armed revolutionaries forced Díaz to resign, he counseled Madero not to make a deal with the old regime. During the Madero administration, he drafted a reform land law, which Madero did not sign. After Madero's murder in the February 1913 coup d'état, Cabrera was a key civilian adviser to the Primer Jefe of the Constitutionalist Army, Venustiano Carranza.  He retired from politics following the ouster and death of Carranza in 1920.

Biography 
Cabrera was born in Zacatlán, the son of the baker Cesáreo Cabrera Ricaño and Gertrudis Lobato; an uncle, Daniel Cabrera Rivera (1858-1914), was a journalist and head of the anti-Porfirio Díaz publication El Hijo de Ahuizote and was the older brother of the physician and governor of Puebla (1917–20) Alfonso Cabrera. Luis married Guillermina Nevraumont (1884–1968) and was later married to Elena Cosío.

Cabrera was assistant teacher at the Tecomaluca school in Tlaxcala for a while, before he continued his studies and worked for the El Hijo del Ahuizote, his uncle's anti-Díaz publication. In May 1901 he achieved his licenciado degree. Afterwards he was a partner in a law firm with Rodolfo Reyes, son of General Bernardo Reyes, and Andrés Molina Enríquez. Additionally he wrote for several journals. In July 1909 he became a co-founded of the Anti-Re-electionist Party, started a critical campaign against the científico group of Positivist advisers of Porfirio Díaz.   In his articles he also supported the campaign against Porfirio Díaz, who had initially said he would not run in the 1910 elections and then reneged.

Both he and Molina Enríquez were supporters of Bernardo Reyes to succeed Díaz in 1910, but Reyes declined to run and was sent on a military mission to Europe.  Cabrera then joined in support of Francisco I. Madero and the Anti-Reelectionist Party. During the interim presidency of Francisco León de la Barra, who assumed the presidency after the ouster and exile of Díaz and before the election of Madero to the presidency, Cabrera was offered a government post, which he declined in favor of running for the post of federal deputy.  Following Madero's election to the presidency, Cabrera was rejected by the president's advisers for the position of secretary of development, and he then served as a deputy for the Distrito Federal. In 1912 he became director of the Escuela Nacional de Jurisprudencia (today Faculty of Law of the UNAM) and deputy to the Congress.

Following Madero's assassination in February 1913 during General Victoriano Huerta's coup d'état and then restoration of Porfirian policies, Cabrera joined the Constitutionalist faction headed by Venustiano Carranza. Cabrera was "one of the 'First Chief's' principal aides, often credited for being the intellectual behind and theorist of Carrancismo."

Under Venustiano Carranza he was responsible for the Finance and Public Credit branch from 1914 to 1917, and was Secretary of Finance and Public Credit from 1919 to 1920. As political opponent of Pascual Ortiz Rubio, he was deported to Guatemala in 1931, but he returned after a short time. Under the presidency of Venustiano Carranza, Luis Cabrera served also as Constitutionalist delegate to the Niagara Falls negotiations, where the recognition of Carranza as Mexico's President by the U.S. government and the drawback of the U.S. troops from Veracruz were discussed. In 1933, Luis Cabrera declined the candidacy for president, which was offered him by the Partido Anti-rreeleccionista.
A second time the candidacy was offered him by the Partido Acción Nacional in 1946, but he declined it again. After 1950 he had his own lawyer's office and became adviser of president Adolfo Ruiz Cortines.  He died in Mexico City.

A library in Zacatlán, a street and a plaza in the Colonia Roma of Mexico City are named in honor of him.

Works 
Cabrera wrote for several newspapers, and predominantly translated foreign works into Spanish, but was also author of own works.

Essays
 Las manzanas de Zacatlán, 1940
 El matrimonio, 1951

Poetry
 Musa peregrina (includes versions of other poets), 1921

Collected works
 Obra jurídica, 1972
 Obra literaria, 1974
 Obra política, 1975

Further reading
Clements, Kendrick A. "Emissary from a Revolution: Luis Cabrera and Woodrow Wilson 1." The Americas 35.3 (1979): 353-371.
 Gibbon, Thomas Edward. Mexico Under Carranza ( Doubleday, Page, 1919) online.
LaFrance, David. "Luis Cabrera Lobato" in Encyclopedia of Mexico, vol. 1, pp. 176–77. Chicago: Fitzroy and Dearborn 1997.
de Beer, Gabriella. Luis Cabrera: Un intelectual en la Revolución mexicana. Mexico City: Fondo de Cultura Económica 1984.
Meyer, Eugenia. Luis Cabrera: Teórico y crítico de la Revolución. Mexico City: Secretaría de Educación Pública (SEP) 80, 1982.

References

External links 
 

Mexican revolutionaries
Mexican male writers
20th-century Mexican lawyers
Mexican Secretaries of Finance
People of the Mexican Revolution
Academic staff of the National Autonomous University of Mexico
Politicians from Puebla
Writers from Puebla
People from Zacatlán
1876 births
1954 deaths